G. Sasikumar is an Indian film editor, who has worked on Tamil, Kannada and Malayalam language films.

Selected filmography

As editor

 Kaadhal (2004)
 December (2005)
 Bambara Kannaley (2005)
 Sandakozhi (2005)
 Imsai Arasan 23rd Pulikecei (2006)
 Kalvanin Kadhali (2006)
 Uyir (2006)
 Azhagai Irukkirai Bayamai Irukkirathu (2006)
 Thiruvilaiyaadal Aarambam (2006)
 Malaikottai (2007)
 Deepavali (2007)
 Sabari(2007)
 Nam Naadu (2007)
 Sivi (film) (2007)
 Kalloori (2007)
 Pidichirukku(2008)
 Sandai (2008)
 Kannum Kannum (2008)
 Arai En 305-il Kadavul (2008)
 TN 07 AL 4777 (2008)
 Pattalam (2009 film) (2009)
 Guru Sishyan (2010)
 Sindhu Samaveli (2010)
 Aayiram Vilakku (2011)
 Vinmeengal (2012)
 Sutrula (2014)
 Kalai Vendhan (2015)
 Agathinai (2015)
 Arjunan Kadhali (2016)
 Tharai Thappattai (2016)
 Pakka (2018)
 Charlie Chaplin 2 (2019)
 Kodai (2023)
 Asurakulam (TBA)

References

External links
 

Living people
Kannada film editors
Malayalam film editors
Tamil film editors
Year of birth missing (living people)